The Juru people also known as the ‘Yuru’ people are the proud Aboriginal people of the state of Queensland

Country
Their southwestern limits ran to the Bogie Range, and south to Mount Pleasant and Mount Abbot. On the coast they were at Upstart Bay. They were neighbours of the Bindal.

Language

The Juru people spoke the Yuru language, now extinct, also known as one of the Lower Burdekin languages.

Native title
Descendants of the Juru people put in a claim for their native title rights in 2010. A conflict emerged over Juru claims for compensation from the owners of some 130 huts located around the mouth of the Elliot River and  Curlewis, which as of 2016 had not been settled.

Natural resource management

A Traditional Owner Reference Group consisting of representatives of the Yuwibara, Koinmerburra, Barada Barna, Wiri, Ngaro, and those Juru and Gia  people whose lands are within Reef Catchments Mackay Whitsunday Isaac region, helps to support natural resource management and look after the cultural heritage sites in the area.

Alternative names
 Euronbba
 Malmal (toponym for the lower course of the Burdekin River)
 Mal Mai
 Arwur-angkana (?)
 South Murri

Notes

Citations

Sources

Aboriginal peoples of Queensland